Holles is a surname. Notable people with the surname include:

Denzil Holles (disambiguation), multiple people
Francis Holles (1627–1690), English statesman
Gervase Holles (1607–1675), English lawyer, antiquarian, and politician
William Holles (disambiguation), multiple people